Better Days Ahead is a 1989 Brazilian comedy-drama film directed by Carlos Diegues.

Plot
The staff of a dubbing studio celebrates the announcement of a Brazilian dubbing of an acclaimed show called The Mary Shadow Show. Mary Shadow is played by brazilian biggest rockstar, Rita Lee. To dub the main character, Dalila (Zezé Motta) indicates her neighbor Marialva (Marília Pêra), who adopts the name "Mary Mattos" as she dreams about becoming a Hollywood star. Marialva lives tormented by the death of her former boyfriend, and finds refuge on Wallace (José Wilker), a married man who promises he will abandon his family to live with her.

Meanwhile, Pompeu (Paulo José), the dubbing director falls in love with Marialva and says he will direct a film starring her. After some dates, Marialva asks Pompeu to go to Jacarepaguá, the district where Wallace lives; when he notices she just wanted to Wallace, Pompeu abandons Marialva there. From the top of a tree, Marialva witnesses Wallace with his family as he dies of a heart attack. After this, Marialva says to Dalila she will quit from the job.

When Dalila asks her to translate a letter from an American admirer, Marialva discovers The Mary Shadow Show needs a new actress to play the role of Mary Shadow's maid. Without telling to no one, Marialva goes to Wallace's office, takes some money he had left, and travels to the United States aiming to get the role. In the end, Marialva gets the role and when a new episode from The Mary Shadow Show arrives at the dubbing studio, Pompeu, Dalila and the rest of staff are thrilled.

Cast
Marília Pêra as Marialva "Mary" Mattos
Paulo José as Pompeu
Zezé Motta as Dalila
José Wilker as Wallace Caldeira
Rita Lee as Mary Shadow
Marilu Bueno as Adelaide
Paulo César Pereio as Pereira
Aurora Miranda as Aurora 
Antônio Pedro as Salgado
Betina Vianny as Janete
Benjamin Cattan as Ferreirão
Patricio Bisso as Juanita
Joffre Soares as Coronel

Release and reception
After a limited release on September 4, 1989, the film was first exhibited to general audience through TV Globo in the early 90s; thus, film distributors boycotted Better Days Ahead on its theatrical release on October 4, 1991.

In 1990, Better Days Ahead won the Special Prize at the Denver Film Festival and Biarritz Film Festival. It won the 1991 Cartagena Film Festival in the categories Best Screenplay and Best Actress (Pêra). In addition, it was the Brazilian submission for the 62nd Academy Awards for Best Foreign Language Film, although it was not nominated.

References

External links

1989 comedy-drama films
1989 films
Brazilian comedy-drama films
Films about actors
Films directed by Carlos Diegues
1980s Portuguese-language films
Films set in Rio de Janeiro (city)
Films shot in Rio de Janeiro (city)
1989 comedy films
1989 crime drama films